Blooming Rose is an unincorporated community in the southwest corner of Phelps County, in the U.S. state of Missouri. The community is on Missouri Route K between Beulah to the east and Duke to the north.

History
Blooming Rose was named for a bed of wild roses near the original town site.  The Blooming Rose post office closed in 1955.

References

Unincorporated communities in Phelps County, Missouri
Unincorporated communities in Missouri